Ruslan Ivanovich Magal (born 24 September 1991) is a Russian football player. He plays for FC Fakel Voronezh.

Club career
He made his professional debut in the Russian Professional Football League for FC Vybor-Kurbatovo Voronezh on 12 July 2014 in a game against FC Tambov.

He made his Russian Football National League debut for FC Sibir Novosibirsk on 11 July 2015 in a game against FC Volgar Astrakhan.

Magal made his Russian Premier League debut for FC Fakel Voronezh on 17 July 2022 against FC Krasnodar.

Career statistics

References

External links
 
 Interview in Torpedo
 Profile by Football National League

1991 births
Footballers from Voronezh
Living people
Russian footballers
Association football midfielders
Association football defenders
FC Sibir Novosibirsk players
FC Baltika Kaliningrad players
FC Torpedo Moscow players
FC Fakel Voronezh players
Russian Premier League players
Russian First League players
Russian Second League players